The Can-Am United Floorball Club, known simply as Can-Am United FC, is a floorball club consisting of players from both Canada and the United States.

The club is one of the first ever joint Canada-U.S. floorball clubs, and will be a building block on which ties can be strengthened between both floorball in Canada and in the United States. As well, it will build a partnership between many players. The club is only the second joint team ever in the history of North American floorball, the previous being the North-American All-Star Team, which participated in the intermediate division of the 2007 Czech Open.

History
The floorball club was created in 2010 by several North American free agent players looking for a team to participate with at the Canada Cup. After being in contact with each other and finding other players, the team registered for the tournament in the Intermediate Division.

The club is a mix of three North American floorball clubs: Alaska's Arctic Floorball Monkeys, the Boston Bandyts Floorball Club, and the Edmonton Panthera Floorball Club. As well, the team has free agent players from Colorado, D.C., Massachusetts, and Vermont.

2010 Canada Cup

Roster difficulties
Originally posed to send three players to the tournament, the Edmonton Panthera could only send one, but instead were able to pick up another free agent player from the Vaughan Sharks in the form of Paul Charbonneau.

Tournament results
Can-Am FC played in the intermediate division, with their debut being on May 22, 2010 at York University, in Toronto, Ontario. They won their first match by a score of 3:2 over Innebandy Chicago.

After steamrolling the St. James Floorball Club by a score of 9:1, the club was shut out in its next two matches against Toronto Floorball League clubs iMove Blue Collars and Striation Six Striators by scores of 2:0 and 3:0, respectively.

Following the 4 round robin matches, Can-Am United found itself tied for 4th place in their division with the iMove Blue Collars. Due to tournament tiebreaker rules, the iMove Blue Collars advanced to the playoff round based on head-to-head statistics, eliminating Can-Am United from the tournament.

Roster
As of May 28, 2010

Note: Paul Charbonneau, Matthew Ellis, and Myles Hacking double as both defensemen and goalkeepers

Rankings & records

Franchise scoring leaders
To sort this table by any column, click on the  icon next to the column title.

Tournament records

Head-to-head records

See also
Canada Cup
Edmonton Panthera FC
2010 Canada Cup, Intermediate Division

References

External links
Arctic Floorball Monkeys
Official Canada Cup Intermediate Division Page

Canadian floorball teams
United States floorball teams
Floorball in Canada
Floorball in the United States
Floorball in North America